Patrick Michael Duffy (born 1943) is a former United States district judge of the United States District Court for the District of South Carolina.

Education and career

Born in Charleston, South Carolina, Duffy received a Bachelor of Arts degree from The Citadel in 1965 and a Juris Doctor from the University of South Carolina Law Center in 1968. He was a staff attorney of Neighborhood Legal Assistance Office from 1968 to 1969, and then served as a Military Police officer in the United States Army from 1969 to 1971. He then entered private practice in Charleston until 1995, and was also an assistant county attorney of Charleston from 1973 to 1974.

Federal judicial service

On October 11, 1995, Duffy was nominated by President Bill Clinton to a seat on the United States District Court for the District of South Carolina vacated by Matthew J. Perry. Duffy was confirmed by the United States Senate on December 22, 1995, and received his commission on December 26, 1995. He took senior status on December 27, 2009 and was succeeded by Timothy M. Cain. He retired from active service on April 1, 2019.

References
  

1943 births
Living people
Judges of the United States District Court for the District of South Carolina
United States district court judges appointed by Bill Clinton
United States Army officers
Lawyers from Charleston, South Carolina
University of South Carolina School of Law alumni
20th-century American judges
21st-century American judges